Alan Orloff is an author of mystery, thriller, horror, and young adult novels. His young adult novel I Play One on TV won the 2021 Agatha Award for Best Children/Young Adult Fiction and Anthony Award for Best Best Young Adult Novel.

Awards and honors 
Orloff's short story “Rule Number One” was selected for inclusion in The Best American Mystery Stories 2018, edited by Louise Penny and Otto Penzler.

Publications

Standalone novels 

 Diamonds for the Dead (2010)
 The Taste (2011)
 First Time Killer (2012)
 Ride-Along (2013)
 Running From the Past (2015)
 Pray for the Innocent (2019)
 I Know Where You Sleep (2020)
 I Play One On TV (2021)

Last Laff Mystery series 

 Killer Routine (2011)
 Deadly Campaign (2012)

References

External links 

 Official website

Mystery writers
Year of birth missing (living people)
Living people